Chorthippus mollis is a species belonging to the family Acrididae, subfamily Gomphocerinae. It is found across much of Europe. The species prefers dry-warm locations with sandy ground and open soil, also roadsides, clearcuts and fallow land.

References

mollis
Orthoptera of Europe
Insects described in 1825